Nacho Borracho is a bar and Mexican/Tex-Mex restaurant in Seattle, in the U.S. state of Washington.

Description 
The bar and Mexican restaurant Nacho Borracho (English: "drunk nacho") is located on Broadway on Seattle's Capitol Hill. The Daily Meal has described the establishment as a "late-night Tex-Mex dive". The drink menu has included frozen cocktails such as avocado margaritas and pink guava Moscow mules. 

The restaurant has housed other businesses. Neon Taco, operated by chef Monica Dimas until 2019, was described as Nacho Borracho's "resident taco shop". In 2016, Eater Seattle said: In 2021, the website said Nacho Borracho was "home to the stellar taco window El Xolo, as well as bagels from Loxsmith during breakfast and brunch hours Thursday through Sundays". El Solo serves "slow-roasted pork in tortillas nixtamalized from scratch and airy light queso-topped chips", according to Gabe Guarente of Eater Seattle.

History 
The restaurant opened in February 2014. In 2015, Dimas announced plans to open a Mexican street food concept, operating from Nacho Borracho's take-out window. Neon Taco closed in March 2019. Chef Ricardo Valdes opened El Xolo as a replacement almost immediately.

In 2018, security called police seeking to remove political activist Joey Gibson, who refused to leave. According to Megan Hill of Eater Seattle, "Patriot Prayer supporters then flooded Neon Taco's Yelp page with negative reviews", many of which were subsequently removed.

Reception 
Julia Wayne included Nacho Borracho in Seattle Magazine's 2014 overview of the city's best Mexican restaurants. Lara Douglass included the restaurant in Eater Seattle 2016 overview of "where to get your Tex-Mex fix in Seattle". The website's Gabe Guarente included Nacho Borracho in a 2019 list of 8 "super cool Seattle spots to drink margaritas". Megan Hill and Guarente included the restaurant in Eater Seattle  2021 list of "where to find terrific boozy frozen drinks in Seattle".

See also 

 List of dive bars
 List of Mexican restaurants
 List of Tex-Mex restaurants

References

External links 

 Nacho Borracho at Zomato

2014 establishments in Washington (state)
Capitol Hill, Seattle
Dive bars in Washington (state)
Mexican restaurants in Seattle
Restaurants established in 2014
Tex-Mex restaurants